The Dopamines are an American punk rock band from Cincinnati formed in late 2006 by Matt Hemingway (drums), Jon Lewis (guitar, vocals) and Jon Weiner (bass, vocals). In 2008, Hemingway left the band and was replaced by Michael Dickson.

Occasionally, the band had toured with a second guitarist, including Mikey Erg from The Ergs! Since 2013, Josh Goldman has been the band's second guitarist.

History
Jon Lewis and Matt Hemingway played together in the Cincinnati punk band Black Tie Bombers (which also featured Ryan Rockwell of Mixtapes), while Lewis and Jon Weiner played together in Ukraine Crane. Together they formed The Dopamines and recorded a self-titled album in 2008, which was received positively. The punk-rock fanzine Razorcake described, "…they sound like they're having the times of their lives, playing to a sweaty basement of wigging-out friends. That energy and the precision how they play make this record a fun, strong listen."

Later that year, The Dopamines played Insubordination Fest, in Baltimore, which was part of the band's tour with The Leftovers. At the festival, video crews recorded the band's set, which were later released as a live CD/DVD titled Live From Baltimore.

In 2009, a new song, "My Future's so Bright I Have to Wear Night Vision Goggles", appeared on Volume III of the Traffic Street Records "Dangerous Intersections" 4-way split series along with Todd Congelliere, Apocalypse Meow, and Closet Fairies. Later that year, the band released a split 7-inch with The Copyrights titled "Songs About Fucking Up".

In 2010, the band released its second album "Expect The Worst" on Paper + Plastick Records, and went on tour with Paper + Plastick founder Vinnie Fiorello's band Less Than Jake. The new album was recorded by Less Than Jake guitarist Roger Lima and Teen Idols drummer Matt Yonker, and mixed by Descendents guitarist Stephen Egerton.

In March 2011, the band started recording a new album, produced by Yonker; the album, Vices, was released in June 2012.

Band members 
Current members
Jon Lewis- guitar, vocals (2006–present)
Jon Weiner- bass, vocals (2006–present)
Michael Dickson- drums (2008–present)
Josh Goldman- guitar (2013–present)

Former members
Matt Hemingway- drums (2006-2008)

Touring members
Mikey Erg- guitar

Discography

Studio albums
Dopamines (2008) (It's Alive Records)
Expect the Worst (2010) (Paper + Plastick)
Vices (2012) (It's Alive Records)
Tales of Interest (2017) (RGF Records US - Bearded Punk Records EU)

Live albums
Live from Baltimore (2009) (Insubordination Records)

EPs
Soap And Lampshades (2009) (Cold Feet Records)

Splits
Dopamines/Til Plains (2008) (split 7-inch) (It's Alive Records)
Songs About Fucking Up (2009) (split 7-inch with The Copyrights) (It's Alive Records)
Portrait Parle (2011) (split 7-inch with Dear Landlord) (Paper + Plastick)

Music videos
 Public Domain (2010)
 More Chords, Better Value (2012)
 Business Papers (2012)
 083133 (Ollie's Song) (2019)
 King of Swilling Powers (2019)

Compilation appearances
 Dangerous Intersections III (2009) (Traffic Street Records)
 The Thing That Ate Larry Livermore (2012) (Adeline Records)

References

External links
 

2006 establishments in Ohio
Pop punk groups from Ohio
Musical groups established in 2006
Musical groups from Cincinnati
Punk rock groups from Ohio